Minnow End is a hamlet in the parish of Great Waltham in Chelmsford district, in the English county of Essex. Nearby settlements include the town of Chelmsford and the villages of Great Waltham and Little Waltham. For transport there is the B1008 road, the A131 road and the A130 road nearby.

References 
 Essex A-Z (page 23)

Hamlets in Essex
Great Waltham